"If There Hadn't Been You" is a song written by Tom Shapiro and Ron Hellard, and recorded by American country music artist Billy Dean. It was released in August 1992 as the fourth and final single from Dean's album Billy Dean. The song reached number 3 on the Billboard Hot Country Singles & Tracks chart in November 1992 and number 1 on the RPM Country Tracks chart in Canada the following month.

Music video
The music video was directed by Roger Pistole and premiered in mid-1992. Filmed at the Majestic Theatre on Broadway in New York City, it features Dean performing both outside and inside the theater, both on stage and on a balcony, as well as in the parking garage of the theater.

Chart performance

Year-end charts

References

1992 singles
Billy Dean songs
Songs written by Tom Shapiro
Song recordings produced by Tom Shapiro
Capitol Records Nashville singles
1991 songs
Songs written by Ron Hellard